ASCL may stand for:
 American Society of Comparative Law
 Association of School and College Leaders
 Astrophysics Source Code Library
 Arsenic trichloride (AsCl3)
 Atlantic Shopping Centres Limited, now known as Crombie REIT